The Devil's Chimney is a scenic rock cleft with steps descending into the Bonchurch Landslips between Bonchurch and Luccombe, Isle of Wight.

Its upper end is at the Smuggler's Haven Tearooms on St Boniface Down, at the southern end of clifftop parkland accessed from the Leeson Road car park on the A3055 road, where there is a Southern Vectis bus route 3 stop.

One of several such paths connecting the clifftop to the Isle of Wight Undercliff, the Devil's Chimney follows a joint through the Upper Greensand crags capping the cliffs above the Landslip. The path continues down through the Landslip as footpath V65C, meeting the coastal path V65A at its foot.

A similar rock cleft, the Chink, is about 200 yards north.

The feature is within the Bonchurch Landslip nature reserve, managed by Gift to Nature on behalf of the owners, the Isle of Wight Council.

References 

Landforms of the Isle of Wight
Tourist attractions on the Isle of Wight
Rock formations of England